The Roman Catholic Diocese of Caicó is a diocese located in the city of Caicó in the Ecclesiastical province of Natal in Brazil.

History
 November 25, 1939: Established as Diocese of Caicó from the Diocese of Natal

Bishops
 Bishops of Caicó (Roman rite), in reverse chronological order
 Bishop Antônio Carlos Cruz Santos (2014.05.24-present)
 Bishop Manoel Delson Pedreira da Cruz, O.F.M.Cap. (2006.07.05 – 2012.08.08), appointed Bishop of Campina Grande, Paraiba; future Archbishop
 Bishop Jaime Vieira Rocha (1995.11.29 – 2005.02.16), appointed Bishop of Campina Grande, Paraiba
 Bishop Heitor de Araújo Sales (1978.05.05 – 1993.10.27), appointed Archbishop of Natal, Rio Grande do Norte
 Bishop Manuel Tavares de Araújo (1959.01.08 – 1978.03.29)
 Bishop José Adelino Dantas (1952.06.10 – 1958.05.03), appointed Bishop of Garanhuns, Pernambuco
 Bishop José de Medeiros Delgado (1941.03.15 – 1951.09.04), appointed Archbishop of São Luís do Maranhão, Brazil

Other priest of this diocese who became bishop
Francisco de Assis Dantas de Lucena, appointed Bishop of Guarabira, Paraiba in 2008

References

 GCatholic.org
 Catholic Hierarchy
  Diocese website (Portuguese)

Roman Catholic dioceses in Brazil
Christian organizations established in 1939
Caico, Roman Catholic Diocese of
Roman Catholic dioceses and prelatures established in the 20th century
1939 establishments in Brazil